The Grand Order of Mugunghwa is the highest order awarded by the government of South Korea. It is awarded to the President of South Korea, and it may be awarded to their spouse, heads or former heads of state of South Korean allies, and their spouses. The order is presented for, "Outstanding meritorious services in the interest of promoting the development and security of the Republic of Korea."

The Grand Order of Mugunghwa takes its name from South Korea's national flower, the rose of Sharon. The rose of Sharon is a cultivar native to the Korean peninsula and has great cultural significance in Korean history.

Appearance
The Grand Order of Mugunghwa consists of "an insignia worn around the neck, a badge affixed to sash worn over the shoulder and a star, with a ribbon and a lapel badge as necessary," according to law. The Grand Order of Mugunghwa may be made of gold, silver, ruby and amethyst. As of 2013, the cost to produce it was approximately 20 million won, or $19,000 USD.

Controversies 
The Grand Order of Mugunghwa is traditionally awarded to the incoming President of South Korea shortly after their inauguration. However, Former President Roh Moo-hyun opted to accept the award upon his departure from office in 2008.

After their conviction for treason in 1996, former presidents Chun Doo-hwan and Roh Tae-woo were ordered to return the Grand Order of Mugunghwa along with other state decorations. While Chun agreed to return the awards, he and Roh never did.

By statute, the Grand Order of Mugunghwa is the highest decoration in Korea, however in the eyes of the public it is not as well regarded.  Many Koreans feel that the order has far less significance.  This is due to the fact that it is self-awarded and is based on winning an election, not on any positive achievements for the country.  There is also the fact that it is given to foreign heads of state, not necessarily because of what they have done for Korea, but for what they may do for Korea in the future.

Recipients

See also 
 Orders, decorations, and medals of South Korea

References

External links
Images of Grand Order of Mugunghwa (in Korean with some English)

Orders, decorations, and medals of South Korea
1949 establishments in South Korea
Awards established in 1949